Cajatambo or Kashatampu is the capital of the Cajatambo Province in the Lima Region of Peru.

History 
Founded during the Tawantinsuyu (Inca Empire) before the advent of the Spanish conquistadors, with the name of Kasha Tanpu, it was one of the stops along the Inca highway, being part of the imperial region of Chinchay Suyu.

Demography 

The population of Cajatambo was estimated in 1896 to be roughly 6,000 people, although roughly 15 years later the Encyclopædia Britannica Eleventh Edition put the population at closer to 4,500.

In recent decades many people have migrated to places with better opportunities and services, such as the city of Lima.

Spanish is the language which the majority of the population (80.05%) learnt to speak in childhood, followed by Quechua (19.27%). The variety of Quechua spoken in the area is the Cajatambo Quechua (part of the Central Quechua "Wankay"), a Quechua I dialect which shares 74% intelligibility with the neighboring Huamalies Quechua.

Toponymy 
The toponym Cajatambo comes from the Quechua words: kasha ("thorn", "cold") and tanpu ("inn").

Geography 
Geographically, Cajatambo is located in the Quechua region bordering the Suni region, its climate is dry and moderately cold with the sun's rays being temperate, however the temperature drops considerably at night.

Economy

Near the city there are silver mines, which used to employ a section of the population. In 2002, the Peruvian government declared regions of the mountains upon which Cajatambo is located to be protected, and future mining was prohibited.

Nowadays, Cajatambo's vicinity is agricultural and pastoral. It is known for its cheeses, butter, manjar blanco and chicharrón, which are found at very economic prices.

Tourism 
Some tourist attractions near the town include the Astobamba's prairie and its peaks, the Baths of Shucsha, and of course the incredible Waywash range.

Inca trails are still preserved and they are used as bridle paths by the locals.

The fauna of Cajatambo conserves several wild species: andean foxes, vicuñas, vizcachas, andean condors, eagles, falcons, among others. In the same town falcons can be seen.

References

Populated places in the Lima Region